Farfantepenaeus is a genus of prawns in the family Penaeidae. Its eight species were formerly included in the genus Penaeus. It was first published as a genus name in 1972 by Rudolf N. Burukovsky, but without the necessary designation of a type species. That situation was corrected by the same author in 1997. The name Farfantepenaeus commemorates the Cuban carcinologist Isabel Pérez Farfante.

Species
Farfantepenaeus aztecus – northern brown shrimp
Farfantepenaeus brasiliensis – red-spotted shrimp, spotted pink shrimp
Farfantepenaeus brevirostris – crystal shrimp, pink shrimp
Farfantepenaeus californiensis – yellowleg shrimp, brown shrimp
Farfantepenaeus duorarum – northern pink shrimp
Farfantepenaeus notialis – southern pink shrimp
Farfantepenaeus paulensis – São Paulo shrimp, Carpas shrimp
Farfantepenaeus subtilis – southern brown shrimp

References

Penaeidae